Vietnamese child prodigies (Vietnamese : Thần đồng đất Việt) is a comic series of Vietnam, the first volume called 'Shaman calls grapefruit' published by Tre Publishing House on February 16, 2002. Initially the work was carried out by Le Linh and Phan Thi company. After writing the story for a while, Le Linh stopped writing this comic, and now writing stories as well as related work are in charge by Phan Thi company. The series previously published by Tre Publishing House, followed Van Hoa Sai Gon Publishing House, Thoi Dai Publishing House(from episode 130 to episode 153), Dai Hoc Su Pham Ho Chi Minh City Publishing House (from episode 154 to episode of 168) and now the Dan Tri Publishing House (from episode 169 onwards). With over 100 novels, along with related comic Vietnamese Science prodigy, Vietnamese Fine Arts Prodigy and the Vietnam Mathematics prodigy, Vietnamese Prodigy Hoang Sa-Truong Sa, which is considered the Vietnam comics longest and most successful until the present time. Average one volume per month of Vietnamese Prodigy (printed in black and white) and three new color comics related Vietnamese Prodigy (including Science, Mathematics and Fine Arts) was released.

Plot
Stories set in late Le's dynasty, but the events happening in the series does not match  with the events happening in reality. However, most of the major events happening in the Vietnamese Prodigy are based on real stories, real history of Vietnam. This series tells the story of the life of Le Ti, a poinsettia of Dai Viet along with his close friend's Suu Eo, Dan Beo and Ca Meo. The birth of Ti also abnormal. Previous life he was an intelligent God full of knowledge on Heaven, is then reincarnated into the earth to help Dai Viet. Ti's mother is Hai Hau, after plowing, she tired and sat on the rock to rest but then she got pregnant and brought his birth .

Since childhood, Ti has shown himself as a pious son, eager to learn and intelligent. Even Do Kiet, his teachers were surprised about his knowledge. In Phan Thi village, with his intellect, he also helped his mother, his friends and the people in the village to solve many difficult problems. He passed three exams, Thi Huong, Thi Hoi and Thi Dinh excellently, he became the youngest poinsettia of Dai Viet. Later, he was also recognized as the Poinsettia of both countries(Dai Viet and North Empire).

Ti along Suu, Dan and Ca Meo also had great success in supporting King Le against the invasion of Dai Minh and deal with the emissaries that Dai Minh dispatched. In court, he is incorruptible integrity lord that make princess Phuong Thin falling in love, but because of that he has always been Prime Minister Tao Hong and his children considered Le Ti is thorn in the eyes and find ways to humiliate him, but in the majority of the story he is the winner. Also thanks to an outstanding intellect, The king trustfully gave Ti envoys responsibility to North Empire many time. Over there, Ti also encountered many obstacles from North Emperor  and Vuong Prime Minister created to assassinate him and damaging the prestige of Dai Viet, even nearly kill him some time. Despite being Lord but sometime King still allowed him come home take care of his mom and help the villagers. And of course, ingenious and enthusiastic help from good friends helped people a lot.

Characters 
12 Main Characters: 12 important main characters of the series are named in the order of 12 Zodiac:  Ti (Mouse), Suu (Ox), Dan (Tiger), Meo (Rabbit or Cat), Thin (Dragon), Ty(Snake), Ngo (Horse), Mui (Goat), Than (Monkey), Dau (Rooster), Tuat (Dog) and Hoi (Pig).

Of the 12 main characters of the series, the majority are young people (except Guard Duong Ba Tuat - because he is an adult fully grown

Le Ti (also known as Ti or Ti Sún):Original is Van Tinh Quan god from heaven reincarnated. The youngest Poinsettia of Vietnam. He was a bright face, gigantic intellect, quick learn and good memory, clever. He had made the North empire admired his intelligent and the Emperor of the North awarded him as Poinsettia of both Countries. He many times have save Dai Viet, and Phan Thi Village from  dangerous situations.

He served as Dai Viet chief ambassador to North empire, borderland inspection specialist Lieutenant General, Supreme Commander lead entire people against foreign enemies, the Chief Examiner, and briefly served as Chancellor. He forced marry with princess Phuong Thin, but he refused, so he been taken away Chancellor title. Afterward he served as one King mastermind.

Viet comics
2002 comics debuts